Koleh Ney may refer to:

Koleh Ney, Dowreh
Koleh Ney, Khorramabad